Interiors is a 1978 American drama film written and directed by Woody Allen. It stars Kristin Griffith, Mary Beth Hurt, Richard Jordan, Diane Keaton, E. G. Marshall, Geraldine Page, Maureen Stapleton, and Sam Waterston.

Allen's first fully-fledged film in the drama genre, it was met with acclaim from critics. It received five Academy Award nominations, including Best Director, Best Original Screenplay (both for Allen), Best Actress (Page), and Best Supporting Actress (Stapleton). Page also won the BAFTA Film Award for Best Supporting Actress.

Plot 
The film centers on the three children of Arthur (E. G. Marshall), a corporate attorney, and Eve (Geraldine Page), an interior decorator. Renata (Diane Keaton) is a poet whose husband Frederick (Richard Jordan), a struggling writer, feels eclipsed by her success. Flyn (Kristin Griffith) is an actress who is away most of the time filming; the low quality of her films is an object of ridicule behind her back. Joey (Mary Beth Hurt), who is in a relationship with Mike (Sam Waterston), cannot settle on a career, and resents her mother for favoring Renata, while Renata resents their father's concern over Joey's lack of direction.

One morning, Arthur unexpectedly announces that he wants a separation from his wife and would like to live alone. Eve, who is clinically depressed, attempts suicide. The shock of these two events causes a rift among the sisters. Arthur returns from a trip to Greece with Pearl (Maureen Stapleton), a high-spirited and more "normal" woman, whom he intends to marry. His daughters are disturbed that Arthur would disregard Eve's suicide attempt and find another woman, to whom Joey refers as a "vulgarian."

Arthur and Pearl marry at Arthur and Eve's former summer home, with Renata, Joey and Flyn in attendance. Later in the evening, Joey lashes out at Pearl when Pearl accidentally breaks one of Eve's vases. In the middle of the night, Frederick drunkenly attempts to rape Flyn. Meanwhile, Joey finds Eve in the house, and sadly explains how much she has given up for her mother, and how disdainfully she is treated. Eve walks out onto the beach and into the surf. Joey attempts unsuccessfully to save Eve, but almost drowns in the attempt. Mike rescues Joey, pulling her to shore, so that Pearl revives the drowned victim by tilting Joey's head back and pinching her nose to administer a cycle of two breaths.

The film ends with the family silently attending Eve's funeral, each placing a single white rose, Eve's favorite flower and a symbol of hope to her, on Eve's wooden, perfectly polished coffin, after which all three sisters look out at the sea from their former family beachfront home and comment on how 'peaceful' the sea looks.

Cast

Reception

Box office 
Interiors grossed $10.4 million in the United States and Canada.

Critical response 
On Rotten Tomatoes, it has an approval rating of 81%, based on reviews from 16 critics, with an average score of 6.8/10. On Metacritic, the film has a score of 67, based on reviews from 9 critics, indicating "generally favorable reviews".

Vincent Canby of The New York Times called the film "beautiful" and complimented Gordon Willis on his "use of cool colors that suggest civilization's precarious control of natural forces", but noted:

Richard Schickel of Time wrote that the film's "desperate sobriety...robs it of energy and passion"; Allen's "style is Bergmanesque, but his material is Mankiewiczian, and the discontinuity is fatal. Doubtless this was a necessary movie for Allen, but it is both unnecessary and a minor embarrassment for his well-wishers."

Roger Ebert gave the film four stars and praised it highly, writing "Here we have a Woody Allen film, and we're talking about O'Neill and Bergman and traditions and influences? Yes, and correctly. Allen, whose comedies have been among the cheerful tonics of recent years, is astonishingly assured in his first drama."

Gene Siskel awarded three stars out of four and wrote:

Charles Champlin called the film "somber, intense and stunning," concluding "Like Cries and Whispers, Allen's Interiors is, for all the somberness of the material, in the end an affirmation of life and a transcendent piece of art. The film lovers will love it if joke-seekers do not.

Penelope Gilliatt of The New Yorker wrote: "This droll piece of work is [Allen's] most majestic so far. The theme its characters express is very Chekhovian. It is pinned to the idea that the hardest, and most admirable thing to do is to act properly through a whole life."

James Monaco, in his 1979 published book American Film Now, described Interiors as the most pretentious film by a major American filmmaker in the last 30 years.

In 2016, Interiors was listed as Allen's 11th best film in an article by The Daily Telegraph critics Robbie Collin and Tim Robey, who wrote that "the emotional effort being expended is cumulatively hard to shrug off" and praised Stapleton's performance.

Woody Allen's response 
Allen's own fears about the film's reception are recounted in a biography of Allen by Eric Lax, where he quotes Ralph Rosenblum, the film's editor:

Later, while watching the film with an acquaintance, Allen reportedly said "It's always been my fear. I think I'm writing Long Day's Journey into Night and it turns into Edge of Night."

Looking back on the film in 1982, Allen said:

Accolades

Soundtrack
"Keepin' Out of Mischief Now" (1932) - Written by Fats Waller & Andy Razaf - Performed by Tommy Dorsey & His Orchestra
"Wolverine Blues" (1923) - Written by Ferdinand Morton - Performed by The World's Greatest Jazz Band

Popular culture 
The plot and characters of Interiors are alluded to in the Death Cab for Cutie song "Death of an Interior Decorator" (from Transatlanticism (2003)).

References

External links 
 
 

1978 films
1978 drama films
American drama films
Films about depression
Films about dysfunctional families
Films about suicide
Films based on works by Ingmar Bergman
Films directed by Woody Allen
Films produced by Charles H. Joffe
Films set in New York (state)
Films shot in New York (state)
Films shot in New York City
Films with screenplays by Woody Allen
United Artists films
Films about divorce
Films about sisters
1970s English-language films
1970s American films